Pitcairnia undulata is a plant species in the genus Pitcairnia. This species is endemic to Mexico.

References

undulata
Endemic flora of Mexico